Mikhail Ilyan (Arabic: ميخائيل اليان), was a Syrian politician who served as foreign minister of Syria in the 1940s.

Biography
He was born in Aleppo in 1880 to a wealthy family. In 1928 he cofounded the National Bloc. He was elected as a member (MP) of the Syrian Parliament for many terms and in 1945 he served as minister of foreign affairs. In 1949 he was among the founders of Hizb al Watani (Arabic: The Nationalist Party). In 1956 he headed the Anglo-American sponsored coup in Syria.

References 

1880 births
Members of the People's Assembly of Syria
People from Aleppo
20th-century Syrian politicians
Greek Orthodox Christians from Syria
Foreign ministers of Syria
Year of death missing